Raj Madiraju is an Indian film director, screenwriter, actor and producer. In a career spanning about 20 years, he predominantly worked in Telugu cinema. In 2011 and 2012, he wrote and directed Rushi, for which he won the Nandi Award for Best Story Writer.

Early life and education
Raj Madiraju's family moved to Hyderabad, the state capital, in 1984 thanks to Vijayananda's transfer.  Madiraju studied DECE from Govt. Polytechnic. He joined Grad IETE in 1990 but discontinued due to lack of focus. He did some odd marketing jobs and teaching jobs. His passion for music and entertainment prompted him join Hyderabad Film Talents' Guild, a renowned music group in Hyderabad. He gave stage shows between 1992 and 1996. He joined Avanthi School of Business Management, affiliated to Osmania University, in 1995 to pursue a master's degree in business administration.

Film career
1994-95 was the year that satellite television started coming to Indian homes. Madiraju gave some TV show ideas to famous producer KS Rama Rao and was involved in making pilot episodes while he grew attracted to the bigger, larger than life and more influential medium of film, especially film as a commercial art form. With the help of KS Rama Rao, he joined ace director Dasari Narayana Rao in 1996 even as he was in the midst of his management course. His final year project was in 1997 was "How To Market A Movie".

Assistant Director
He worked from 1996 to 1998 with Dasari Narayana Rao for seven films: Kalyana Praptirastu, Osey Ramulamma, Rowdy Durbar, Greek Veerudu, Sammakka Sarakka, Kante Kuthurne Kanali and Pichchodi Chethilo Raayi.

He then joined Chiranjeevi's unfinished Hollywood venture Return of Abu – Thief of Bagdad in 1999 as assistant director to Suresh Krissna. He worked with stalwarts like Richard Kline, the cinematographer who received the Lifetime Achievement Award from ASC; Giles Masters, the production designer of Mummy and The Da Vinci Code; Douchan Gerci, the director; and AR Rahman, the Academy Award-winning composer, and was supported by Hollywood crew, Panavision equipment and world class ideas at work.

Director (2000–2010)

Madiraju made his directorial debut in 2000 with Tharun starrer Uncle. Produced by star comedian AVS, the film was critically well acclaimed while AVS got a Nandi Jury Award for actor. The commercial failure of the film, however, forced Madiraju to take an unintended sabbatical from feature films, though he continued doing commercials and infomercials for top local brands such as Apollo Hospitals, KIMS, ICICI, Regency group, Manikya Group, Aurora Group, and GPREC. He also helped some films rope in top brands like Fair & Lovely, Bru, Dinshaw's, and McDowell's for in-film branding and associate brands in promotion.

Punditz Consultants
 
During a period of ten years, Madiraju wrote many stories in different genres that can be produced into films.

Return to films
Madiraju's next film was the bilingual techno thriller Aithe 2.0/Pirates 1.0, in 2016. It was produced by Vijaya Rama Raju and Hemanth Reddy Vallapureddy. The film was officially selected for screening at LA Cinefest, Barcelona Planet Film Festival and Calcutta International Cult Film Festival. While it booked a semi-final berth in LA Cinefest, it won the outstanding achievement award at CICFF.

Montages Cinema

His Montages Cinema is in the process of developing story ideas to scripts while also making inroads into the idea of building a talent bank.

Actor

Madiraju has played cameos in films like Osey Ramulamma, Uncle and Andhra Pori, but Nandini Reddy's Kalyana Vaibhogame introduced him as a full time actor. In this film he played the father of Naga Shaurya's character. The film did well and opened up opportunities to Madiraju as an actor. He made significant appearances in films including Appatlo Okadundevadu, Raja Meeru Keka, and Jawan.

Personal life
Raj Madiraju married Mythily in 1997 and they have one daughter.

Filmography

References 

Telugu film directors
Indian experimental filmmakers
Indian action choreographers
Indian casting directors
Living people
1969 births
Filmfare Awards winners
Nandi Award winners
20th-century Indian film directors
Artists from Vijayawada
Film directors from Andhra Pradesh
21st-century Indian film directors
Screenwriters from Andhra Pradesh
Indian film directors